The 2008–09 Regionalliga season was the first season of the Regionalliga at tier four of the German football league system and the 15th overall since re-establishment of the league in 1994. It was contested in three regional divisions of eighteen teams in each. The champions, Holstein Kiel, Borussia Dortmund II and 1. FC Heidenheim 1846 were promoted to the 3. Liga.

Team Movements

Teams Promoted from Regionalliga

To 2. Bundesliga

From Nord
Rot-Weiß Ahlen (Nord Champions)
Rot-Weiß Oberhausen (Nord Runners-Up)

From Süd
FSV Frankfurt (Süd Champions)
FC Ingolstadt 04 (Süd Runners-Up)

To 3. Liga

From Nord
Fortuna Düsseldorf
1. FC Union Berlin
SV Werder Bremen II
Wuppertaler SV
Rot-Weiß Erfurt
Dynamo Dresden
Kickers Emden
Eintracht Braunschweig

From Süd
VfB Stuttgart II
VfR Aalen
SV Sandhausen
SpVgg Unterhaching
SV Wacker Burghausen
FC Bayern München II
SSV Jahn Regensburg
Stuttgarter Kickers

Teams promoted from the Oberliga

To Nord

From NOFV-Oberliga Nord
Hertha BSC II
Hansa Rostock II
Türkiyemspor Berlin

From NOFV-Oberliga Süd
Hallescher FC
Chemnitzer FC
VFC Plauen
FC Sachsen Leipzig

From Oberliga Nord
Holstein Kiel
Altona 93
SV Wilhelmshaven
Hannover 96 II
BV Cloppenburg

To West

From Oberliga Westfalen
Preußen Münster
FC Schalke 04 II
VfL Bochum II
Sportfreunde Lotte

From Oberliga Nordrhein
Borussia Mönchengladbach II 
Bayer Leverkusen II 
1. FC Köln II 
1. FC Kleve

From Oberliga Südwest
1. FSV Mainz 05 II
1. FC Kaiserslautern II
Wormatia Worms
Eintracht Trier

To Süd

From Oberliga Baden-Württemberg
SC Freiburg II
SSV Ulm 1846
Waldhof Mannheim
1. FC Heidenheim

From Bayernliga
SpVgg Greuther Fürth II  
1. FC Nürnberg II
TSV Großbardorf
1. FC Eintracht Bamberg

From Hessenliga
SV Darmstadt 98
SV Wehen Wiesbaden II
Viktoria Aschaffenburg 
Eintracht Frankfurt II

Regionalligas

Regionalliga Nord

Top scorers

Source: Weltfussball.de

Regionalliga West

Top scorers

Source: Weltfussball.de

Regionalliga Süd (South)

Top scorers

Source:Weltfussball.de

References

External links
 Regionalliga at the German Football Association 
 Regionalliga Nord 2008–09 at kicker.de
 Regionalliga Süd 2008–09 at kicker.de
 Regionalliga West 2008–09 at kicker.de

Regionalliga seasons
4
German